Solaris Multiplexed I/O (MPxIO), known also as Sun StorageTek Traffic Manager (SSTM, earlier Sun StorEdge Traffic Manager), is multipath I/O software for Solaris/illumos. It enables a storage device to be accessed through multiple host controller interfaces from a single operating system instance. The MPxIO architecture helps protect against I/O outages due to I/O controller failures. Should one I/O controller fail, MPxIO automatically switches to an alternate controller.

This architecture also increases I/O performance by load balancing across multiple I/O channels.

It was integrated within the Solaris operating system beginning in February 2000 with Solaris 8 release.

The file to enable or disable mpxio has been moved in Solaris 10 from /kernel/drv/scsi_vhci.conf to the bottom of the file /kernel/drv/fp.conf and /kernel/drv/mpt.conf.

See also
 Multipath I/O

References

External links
 Oracle Solaris SAN Configuration and Multipathing Guide (September 2010)
 Sun StorageTek Traffic Manager Software

Sun Microsystems software
Computer storage technologies
Fault-tolerant computer systems